Isoelectric may refer to:
 Isoelectric point, the pH at which a particular molecule carries no net electrical charge
 Isoelectric focusing, a technique for separating different molecules by differences in their isoelectric point 
 Isoelectric line representing the absence of electrical activity on an electrocardiogram

See also

 Isoelectronicity, similarity of valence electrons and structure of different molecules